"Te acordarás de mí" (in English: "You Will Remember Me") is the lead single by Mexican actress and singer Eiza González from her second album, Te Acordarás de Mí. The song was co-written by Eiza and songwriters, Alejandra Alberti and Carlos Lara in Mexico City. It was released in Mexico for digital download on iTunes for Mexico on April 16, 2012 and released in the United States on May 22, 2012.

Music video
The official music video for "Te Acordarás de Mí" was filmed in Mexico City and directed by Gerald Mates. The music video premiered on April 30, 2012 on Eiza's official Vevo channel.

Track listing
Official single
 "Te acordarás de mí"  – 3:14

Charts

References

2012 singles
Eiza González songs
Songs written by Carlos Lara (songwriter)
2012 songs
EMI Televisa Music singles
Capitol Latin singles